Workingirls is a French television series, broadcast since April 19, 2012 on Canal +.

Premise
WorkinGirls describes the daily life of a company which employs six girls and which records their behaviour: Karine, the sadistic director, Nathalie, the mother with a large family, Helen, the psychologically disturbed, Deborah, the nymphomaniac, and Sophie and Sophie, the little Switchboard welcoming, very lazy.

Cast and characters

Main
 Claude Perron as Karine Brontier (Season 1-4)
 Laurence Arné as Déborah Vernon (Season 1-4)
 Blanche Gardin as Hélène Grilloux (Season 1-3)
 Vanessa David as Nathalie Roneaudi (Season 1-4)
 Alice Belaïdi as Sophie Marteauni (Season 1-4)
 Clémence Faure as Sophie Martineau (Season 1-4)

Recurring
 Franck Bellocq as Bernard (Season 1-3)
 Pascal Stencel as Jean-Luc (Season 1-3)
 Cybèle Villemagne as Joëlle (Season 1-3)
 Edith le Merdy as Maria (Season 1-3)
 Ludovic Pinette as Michel (Season 1-3)
 Dimitri Rataud as Karine's lover (Season 1-2)
 Lannick Gautry as The Handsome (Season 2-3)
 Audrey Lamy as Stéphanie Levasseur (Season 2-3)
 Didier Jean as Loïc (Season 2-3)
 Monsieur Poulpe as Pierrick (Season 2-3)
 Catherine Duros as Cathy (Season 2-3)
 Anne Marivin as Michèle Coignard (Season 3)

Guest
 Alban Lenoir as Window cleaner	
 Bérengère Krief as Cécile
 Brice Fournier as Duverneuil 
 Camille Chamoux as The psychologist
 Claudia Tagbo as Brigitte
 Gianni Giardinelli as A patient
 Olivia Côte as Carole
 Sabine Pakora as Corinne

Episodes

Season 1 (2012)
The first season premiered on Canal+ on April 19, 2012. The season finale aired on May 10, 2012.
 Retour de couches
 Le label
 La grande famille
 L'anniversaire de Karine
 La conquête de l'Orient
 Bonnet C
 Élections internes
 Mon beau stagiaire
 La fusion
 Les parasites
 Panne de clim
 La journée de la secrétaire

Season 2 (2013)
The second season premiered on Canal+ on June 13, 2013. The season finale aired on July 4, 2013.
 Le Déménagement
 Deb in love
 La visite médicale
 Les Catherinettes
 Le plan de licenciement
 La nouvelle Nathalie
 Cost killer
 New management
 La grève
 L'âge de raison
 Lipdub
 La tour infernale

Season 3 (2014)
The third season premiered on Canal+ on February 20, 2014. The season finale aired on March 13, 2014.
 Le Suicide
 Cellule Psychologique
 Le Calendrier
 Tolérance Zéro
 La Rumeur
 La Saint-Valentin
 Stage de survie
 Reportage
 Le grand audit
 Restore Hope
 Les investisseurs Indiens
 This is la fin

Season 4 (2017)
The fourth season premiered on Canal+ on 2017.

Accolades

Home media release
 The season 1 & 2 were released in France on DVD on July 9, 2013.
 The season 3 was released in France on DVD on October 1, 2014.

Adaptations
Workingirls is freely adapted from a Dutch series, Toren C.

The series was adapted in Quebec under the title Complex G, and takes place in the Marie-Guyart Building (commonly called Complex G) in Quebec City. Filming takes place in spring 2014.

References

External links
 
 

2010s French comedy television series
2012 French television series debuts
French television series based on non-French television series
French-language television shows
Television shows set in France
French LGBT-related television shows
Television shows set in Paris
Canal+ original programming